Earlsfield railway station is on the South West Main Line serving Earlsfield in the London Borough of Wandsworth, South London. It is operated by South Western Railway, as are all the trains serving it.

History

The station was named after a large nearby Victorian residence, Earlsfield, now demolished. This was owned by the Davis family, who also owned the land required for the station, and one of the conditions of sale was that the station would be named after their house.

Opened by the London and South Western Railway on 1 April 1884, it became part of the Southern Railway during the grouping of 1923. The station then passed to the Southern Region of British Railways on nationalisation in 1948.

When sectorisation was introduced in the 1980s, the station was served by Network SouthEast until the privatisation of British Rail.

In 2012 Network Rail undertook a major revamp of the station. The main entrance was reconstructed and lifts were installed for each platform as part of a £5.6 million scheme to improve facilities and accessibility, including the provision of step-free access.

Services 

The typical off-peak service from the station is:

12 tph (trains per hour) to London Waterloo via Clapham Junction
3 tph to Guildford, 2 via Surbiton and Cobham and 1 via Epsom and Leatherhead
2 tph to Chessington South
1 tph to  via 
2 tph to Hampton Court
2 tph to 
2 tph to London Waterloo via Kingston and Richmond

Trains to Clapham Junction, Vauxhall and London Waterloo depart from platform 2; trains going away from London depart from platform 3.

Platform 1 is adjacent to the fast down line out of London, but none of the fast services operated by South Western Railway call at Earlsfield, so this platform is only used occasionally when the line served by platform 3 is unavailable. As a safety measure, access to this platform is only possible through sliding gates in the security fencing installed in 2014.

Connections
London Buses Routes 44, 77, 270 and Night Route N44 serve the station.

External links 
Earlsfield Community
Earlsfield Railway Station - Earlsfield Community

References 

Railway stations in the London Borough of Wandsworth
Railway stations in Great Britain opened in 1884
Former London and South Western Railway stations
Railway stations served by South Western Railway